Lunar Muzik is the third studio album by Ant-Bee, released in 1997 by Divine Records.

Track listing

Personnel 
Adapted from Lunar Muzik liner notes.

Musicians
Daevid Allen (Father Gong) – guitar, engineering
Harvey Bainbridge (Hawklord) – synthesizer, engineering
Michael Owen Bruce (Mr. Nice Guy) – guitar, bass guitar, sitar, keyboards
Paul Bruce (Little Joe) – keyboards
Glen Buxton (Zillion Dollar Guitarist) – guitar
Dennis Dunaway – bass guitar
Bunk Gardner – saxophone, clarinet, spoken word, vegetables
Billy James (The Ant-Bee) – vocals, guitar, bass guitar, drums, percussion, keyboards, tape manipulations, production
Steve Kale (Brainyak) – guitar, harmonica
J.K. Lofton (Mix Doctor) – guitar synthesizer, bass guitar, engineering
Rod Martin (Mod Martion) – guitar, bass guitar
Lan Nichols (Kapri-Korn) – bass guitar
Don Preston (Dom DeWilde) – keyboards, spoken word, assorted transformations, engineering
Scott Renfroe (Reoccurring Schizms) – guitar, bass guitar, tape manipulations
Harry Williamson (Professor Drone) – synthesizer

Musicians (cont.)
Jimmy Carl Black (The Indian of the Group) – spoken word, chanting
The Bizarre Vocal Ensemble (Mike Rowell, Jeff Marden, Rod Martin, Alan McBrayer, Suzanne McBrayer) – vocals (1)
Roy Estrada (Pachuco Falsetto) – bizarre laughter, spoken word, wheezing
Bob Harris (Millet Pancake) – Great nostalgic chihuahua impersonations
Roy Herman (Herman Monster) – additional guitar
Mike McManimen (Monk) – additional keyboards
Peter Radloff (James Bond) – additional guitar
George Scala (Sonraw) – Master of the Recorder
Jim Sherwood (Motorhead) – snorks
Neal Smith (The Platinum God) – additional drums
Production and additional personnel
Syd Barrett – illustrations
Patrick Ogelvie – engineering
Scott Renfroe – engineering

Release history

References

External links 
 Lunar Muzik at Discogs (list of releases)

Ant-Bee albums
1997 albums